John Hightower may refer to:

John Hightower (museum director) (1933–2013), American museum director
John Hightower (American football) (born 1996), American football wide receiver
Jack Hightower (1926–2013), American politician